Robert Grzywocz (1 May 1932 – 24 August 2018) was a Polish footballer. He played in two matches for the Poland national football team in 1954.

References

External links
 

1932 births
2018 deaths
Polish footballers
Poland international footballers
Place of birth missing
Association footballers not categorized by position